WGMN (1240 kHz) is a commercial radio station in Roanoke, Virginia.  It broadcasts a talk radio format and is owned and operated by Three Daughters Media.   The studios and offices are in Forest, Virginia.

WGMN is powered at 1,000 watts.  The transmitter is on Cleveland Avenue SW near the Roanoke River.  Programming is also heard on two FM translators:  99.5 W258DN and 101.9 W270CU, both in Roanoke.

Programming
Weekday mornings begin with a local wake up show hosted by Janet Rose, shared with co-owned WIQO-FM.  The rest of the weekday schedule is nationally syndicated talk programs:  Brian Kilmeade and Friends, The Tom Sullivan Show, The Lars Larson Show, CBS Eye on the World with John Batchelor, Our American Stories with Lee Habeeb, The Rich Valdes Show, This Morning, America's First News with  Gordon Deal and The Markley, Van Camp and Robbins Show.  

Weekends feature shows on money, home repair, cars, guns and real estate.  Syndicated hosts include Ben Ferguson, Larry Kudlow and John Catsimatidis.  Most hours begin with an update from CBS Radio News.

History
Its original call sign was WROV, standing for ROanoke, Virginia. The station was a network affiliate of the Mutual Broadcasting System. It was originally powered at 250 watts and had its studios in the Mount Trust Bank Building.

For most of the 1960s and 70s, it broadcast a Top 40 format.  In 1989, WROV began a Golden Oldies format, playing the hits of the 1950s, 60s and early 70s.  In 1998, it became an ESPN network affiliate, changing its call sign to WGMN.  The call letters represent the GaMe Network, for its sports radio format.

WGMN switched to a talk radio format in June 2019.  The station carries mostly syndicated conservative talk shows.

References

External links
Virginia Talk Radio Network Online

WROV History (unofficial WROV Tribute Site)

1946 establishments in Virginia
News and talk radio stations in the United States
Radio stations established in 1946
GMN